This is a list of foreign films shot in Thailand. See also: List of Thai films
Dozens of foreign films have been shot in Thailand, with the kingdom either playing itself or standing in for a neighboring country, such as Vietnam or Cambodia.

The availability of elephants, exotic jungle and beach settings, relatively low production costs, and a mature domestic film industry that provides a legion of experienced crew members, have made Thailand an attractive location for many Hollywood films and other foreign productions.

Films set in Thailand include Around the World in 80 Days, The Big Boss, The Man with the Golden Gun and The Beach. And Thailand has been used as a stand-in setting for such Vietnam War-era films as The Deer Hunter; Good Morning, Vietnam; Casualties of War; and The Killing Fields.

In addition to providing work for Thai film crews and extras (including the Royal Thai Army), films that use Thailand as a location help Thailand promote itself as a tourist destination. As a result, the Tourism Authority of Thailand is keenly interested in attracting production companies to make films in the Kingdom.

Film makers have been criticized for damaging the Thai environment. The island used to depict the villain's hideout in The Man with the Golden Gun is now a major draw for tourism operators in Phuket's Phang Nga Bay. Environmentalists also protested the filming of The Beach, in which the film crew made alterations to Maya Bay that were viewed as damaging.

History

Hollywood has played an important role in the development of Thailand's film industry. One of the first feature films made in Thailand, 1923's Miss Suwanna of Siam, was a Hollywood co-production, made with the royal assistance of King Vajiravudh, who gave the production free use of his 52 automobiles, 600 horses, use of the Royal Thai Navy, the Grand Palace, the railways, the rice mills, rice fields, coconut groves, canals and elephants.

The 1927 documentary, Chang, by Merian C. Cooper and Ernest B. Schoedsack, was made in Thailand.

In recent years, even the Bollywood film industry has chosen Thailand as location.

In 2018, 714 foreign productions—documentaries, TV dramas, series, advertising, short films, and feature films—were shot in Thailand. In the first six months of 2019, 410 productions were shot in Thailand contributing 3.5 billion baht to the economy according to the Thailand Film Office of the Tourism Authority of Thailand (TAT).

Incentives
At the 69th Cannes Film Festival in 2016 Thailand introduced a cash rebate policy for foreign films shot in Thailand. It took effect in January 2017. The program grants a 15% tax rebate for foreign film productions that spend more than 50 million baht. Incentives increase by 2% for films that promote Thai tourism and another 3% for hiring key Thai personnel on set. Filmed advertisements are not eligible for the program.

List of foreign films shot in Thailand

1920s–1970s
 Nangsao Suwan (Suvarna of Siam) (1922-US): Directed by Henry MacRae. A love story with a Thai cast. The film has been lost; only a few stills survive.
Chang: A Drama of the Wilderness (1927-US) – Directors Merian C. Cooper and Ernest B. Schoedsack were assisted by Prince Yugala Dighambara in the production of their silent docudrama about a family of subsistence farmers living in the jungle, battling elephants, tigers and other animals. Among the cast is a gibbon named Bimbo.
 A Handful of Rice (1940-Sweden): Portrays Thailand's rural life in docudrama form.
 Yutthana Siriporn (1963-Germany): Depicts urban life in Bangkok in the early-1960s and examines a Buddhist rite.
Around the World in Eighty Days (1956): Director Michael Todd was able to borrow one of the royal barges of King Bhumibol Adulyadej when the production was in Bangkok.
 The Ugly American (1963-US): Thai statesman Kukrit Pramoj appeared on screen with Marlon Brando, portraying the prime minister of the fictional Southeast Asian country of Sarkhan. He was later elected Prime Minister of Thailand, serving in office in 1975–1976.
 The Big Boss (1971): Chinese American martial artist and Jeet Kune Do founder Bruce Lee portrays Cheng Chao-An, a young fighter from Guangdong who emigrates to Thailand to be with his expatriate family and finds a job working in an ice factory; it soon turns out that the factory is a disguised drug operation, and Cheng soon finds himself having to fight for his life. After the original 1971 premiere, Hong Kong censors demanded that some of the footage be trimmed, including graphic violence, and an entire sequence in which Cheng visits a whorehouse and makes love to a Thai prostitute (featuring the only nude scene in Lee's career). The missing footage is rumoured to still exist.
 Duel of Fists (1971): David Chiang travels to Bangkok looking for his long-lost brother (Ti Lung), who's a muay Thai boxer in this Shaw Brothers Studio film by Chang Cheh. Pawana Chanachit co-starred as a love interest for Chiang's character. Locations include the Dusit Thani Hotel on Rama IV Road, long before overpass bridges and the Bangkok Skytrain were built, as well as the Siam Intercontinental, since razed to make way for Siam Paragon.
Ulagam Sutrum Valiban (1973): Produced and Directed by MGR, a Tamil movie released in 1973 has Bangkok and the Dusit Thani Hotel.
Emmanuelle (1974): Filmed around Bangkok.
 The Man with the Golden Gun (1974) – Filmed around Bangkok and Phang Nga Bay near Phuket. Bond attended a boxing match at Ratchadamnoen Boxing Stadium in Pom Prap Sattru Phai District. One of the islands seen in the film is known as Nail Island. It is the hideout of Scaramanga (Christopher Lee) and is now known as "James Bond Island".
 The Deer Hunter (1978): The Russian roulette bar scene was shot in Patpong, while the POW camp was in Sai Yok, Kanchanaburi Province.

1980s
 Uncommon Valor (1983): Set in Laos but filmed partly in Bangkok. Lao scenery was filmed in Hawaii.
 The Killing Fields (1984-US): Locations in Hua Hin and Phuket stood in for Khmer Rouge-era Cambodia. Actor Spalding Gray recounts the film's shoot in his monologue, Swimming to Cambodia.
 Rambo: First Blood Part II (1985-US): Sylvester Stallone's super soldier goes to Vietnam (actually Thailand) looking for his POW buddies. Followed by Rambo III''', set in Afghanistan, but partially shot in Thailand.
 Good Morning, Vietnam (1987-US): Thai actress Jintara Sukapat portrayed the love interest for Robin Williams' character. Filmed on location in Bangkok, standing in for pre-1975 Saigon.
 Off Limits (1988): Christopher Crowe's Vietnam War crime thriller featured Willem Dafoe and Gregory Hines. The film is also known as Saigon.
 Casualties of War (1989-US): Brian De Palma's Vietnam War saga was filmed around Phuket and Kanchanaburi.Kickboxer (1989): Jean-Claude Van Damme movie about a Westerner who learns muay Thai.

1990s
 Air America (1990): Mae Hong Son Province in northern Thailand stands in for Secret War-era Laos. The film later attracted tourism to the region and was featured on the cover of Conde Nast Traveller in May 1993.
 Heaven & Earth (1993-US): Oliver Stone's Vietnam War-era drama was made in Thailand.
 Operation Dumbo Drop (1995-US): Walt Disney Pictures' Vietnam War comedy-drama features Thai elephants.
 Cutthroat Island (1995): Renny Harlin's swashbuckler was filmed on location in Maya Bay, which would later be used for The Beach.
 Mortal Kombat: Annihilation (1997): Tony Jaa worked as a stunt double and went on to become a major Thai action star. Filming was in historic old Ayutthaya, where a minor stir was caused when scantily clad foreign women were filmed dancing on top of some sacred ruins. Mortal Kombat (1995) also was made in Thailand, around Sukhothai historical park. The opening and closing scenes in Mortal Kombat are also filmed in Ayutthaya.
 Tomorrow Never Dies (1997): Another Bond film and another Bond. Michelle Yeoh co-stars, as Bangkok stands in for Ho Chi Minh City. Scaramanga's island is seen, as Phang Nga Bay substitutes for Halong Bay, Vietnam. Production crew originally were destined to film in Vietnam but were denied entry. Thailand was chosen as an alternate location.
"Brokedown Palace" (1999): Clair Danes and Kate Beckinsale are arrested for smuggling while visiting Thailand. It was partly shot in Bangkok and the Bangkok airport.
 Bangkok Dangerous (1999): Directed by Oxide and Danny Pang. A Thai hit-man story by Hong Kong directors.

2000–2003
 The Beach (2000-US): Environmentalists protested the film because the production crew altered the beach of Ko Phi Phi Leh. A 2006 court ruling held that 20th Century Fox was among the parties responsible for damages.In the Mood for Love (2000): Wong Kar-wai's love story starring Maggie Cheung and Tony Leung Chiu Wai is set in 1960s Hong Kong, but exterior scenes were filmed in Bangkok.
 Butterfly Man (2002): About a British tourist and a Thai masseuse. Directed by Kaprice Kea.City of Ghosts (2002): Matt Dillon's noirish thriller was set in Cambodia and mostly filmed there, but some scenes were shot in Thailand, and many of the crew were Thai people.
 The Medallion (2003): Jackie Chan's action picture was filmed in Thailand under the working title, Highbinders.
 Belly of the Beast (2003): Steven Seagal portrays a former CIA agent who searches in Thailand for his kidnapped daughter. Co-stars Thai actors Sarah Malakul, Pongpat Wachirabanjong, and Chakrit Yamnam.

2004
 2046: Wong Kar-wai's follow-up to In the Mood for Love was filmed partially in Bangkok, and the film underwent post-production processing at Bangkok's Kantana Group labs, where the director made last-minute edits to the film before delivering it late to the 2004 Cannes Film Festival.
 Two Brothers: This family-friendly story about two tigers had some scenes made in Samut Prakan Province, at a tourist site called Mueang Boran (Ancient City), which has scaled-down replicas of many of Thailand's important structures. The tigers used in the film were from the Si Racha Tiger Zoo near Pattaya. The film was set in neighboring Cambodia, and many locations were used there was well.
 Alexander (2004-US): Oliver Stone's epic starring Colin Farrell as Alexander the Great was filmed along the Mekong River in northeastern Ubon Ratchathani Province and in Saraburi Province. Royal Thai Army soldiers were used as extras. Thai actors Bin Bunluerit and Jaran Ngamdee portrayed an Indian king and an Indian prince respectively.Around the World in 80 Days  (2004): This Jackie Chan/Steve Coogan remake of the 1956 film was filmed in Thailand, with scenes shot in Krabi that were meant to take place in a rural village in China. Sammo Hung makes an appearance as Wong Fei Hung.
 Bridget Jones: The Edge of Reason: Made in Bangkok and Phuket, including Bangkok's Soi Cowboy. Tabloid reports that Hugh Grant was chased by bargirls were false.

2005
 Ghost of Nak (2005): A film version of the Mae Nak Phra Khanong legend by a British director.
 Star Wars: Episode III – Revenge of the Sith (2005): The approach to Kashyyyk, the Wookiee homeworld, was filmed around Krabi Province by Santa Film International.
 Stealth (2005): Jamie Foxx, Jessica Biel, and Josh Lucas portray high-tech US Navy aviators. Rest and relaxation scenes are set in Thailand and were filmed on The Beach island, Ko Phi Phi Leh. Neighboring Myanmar is the setting for a missile target, but those scenes were filmed in Australia.
 Blackbeard (2005): With Angus Macfadyen, Stacy Keach, Richard Chamberlain, and Rachel Ward, was filmed in Surat Thani and Nakorn Si Thammarat by Living Films. The story depicts the exploits of English pirate Edward Teach, better known as Captain Blackbeard. Blackbeard roamed the Caribbean in the 18th century. The swashbuckling adventure story appears to take place primarily in the Caribbean city of New Providence in 1717.

2006
 The Elephant King (2006): Directed by Seth Grossman.
 Journey from the Fall: Unable to make his film at home, Vietnamese director Ham Tran came to Thailand to make his drama about Vietnam's re-education camps and the experience of boat people.
 Tsunami: The Aftermath (2006): The HBO-BBC joint production came to Phuket in April–June 2006 to film a mini-series about the 26 December 2004 Indian Ocean earthquake and the resulting tsunami that hit Thailand's Andaman coastline.

2007
 American Gangster (2007-US): Directed by Ridley Scott and starring Denzel Washington and Russell Crowe, the story of an American heroin smuggler was filmed in November 2006 in Chiang Mai.Agence France Press. 26 October 2006. Denzel Washington, Sylvester Stallone to shoot films in Thailand, via The Nation.
 Croc (2007): This Thai Occidental Productions movie about a large man-eating crocodile, was filmed in Thailand in 2006.  Michael Madsen, who plays a crocodile hunter in the film, was in Thailand for the filming. The movie has played on Sky One in the UK, the Sci Fi Channel (United States) channel in the US, and Star Movies in Asia.
 Rambo (2007-US): Sylvester Stallone returned to Thailand to make the fourth installment in his Rambo franchise, directing and starring as the Vietnam War veteran who takes on a mission to protect Christian missionaries delivering aid to the Karen people in Myanmar. Filming was due to start in January 2007.Production Weekly. October 6, 2006. "Stallone looks 'In the Serpent's Eye'"  (retrieved October 11, 2006).
 Rescue Dawn (2007): Werner Herzog came to Thailand in August 2005 to direct this true story of US pilot Dieter Dengler and his escape from a POW camp during the Vietnam War. It stars Christian Bale and Steve Zahn.

2008
 Bangkok Dangerous (also called Big Hit in Bangkok or Time to Kill) (2008): A remake of Bangkok Dangerous by the Pang Brothers, it stars Nicolas Cage and Charlie Yeung and began shooting in Bangkok in August 2006. Production was delayed by the coup d'état.

2009
 Soi Cowboy (2009): The story of a European man and a Thai woman. Directed by Thomas Clay.
 Street Fighter: The Legend of Chun-Li: The second live-action film based on the Street Fighter series of video games. Set in Bangkok.

2010–19

2020–present

List of films set in Thailand
Several films have been set in Thailand, but were made elsewhere. These include:

 Anna and the King of Siam (1946): The first film adaptation of stories written by Anna Leonowens. The film is still banned in Thailand for historical inaccuracies and because Thai authorities claim its depiction of King Mongkut denigrates and trivializes the monarch and the royal family. It was filmed in California.
 The King and I (1956): The film of the musical is banned in Thailand for the same reasons as Anna and the King of Siam.
 The Bridge on the River Kwai (1957): Based on a novel by Pierre Boulle, David Lean's highly fictionalized account of work on the Death Railway contains many historical inaccuracies. It was filmed in Ceylon.
 Uncommon Valor (1983): A scene depicting the Laotian-Thai border was filmed in Hawaii.
 Missing in Action (1984) and Braddock: Missing in Action III (1988): Chuck Norris's two films were partially set in Bangkok but filmed in the Philippines.
 Anna and the King (1999): With a Thai adviser and many Thai actors in the cast, Andy Tennant's remake of the 1946 film went through several rewrites in an effort to win approval by the Thai government so the movie could be made and shown there. However, the screenplay still contained too many inaccuracies, so the production was moved to Malaysia. The film is banned in Thailand, though video copies have found their way into the kingdom and the film has gained a following.
 Brokedown Palace (1999): Alice and Darlene, best friends, decide to take a trip to Thailand to celebrate high-school graduation. While there, they are befriended by charming Australian rogue Nick Parks. Nick convinces them to take a weekend side trip to Hong Kong, but at the airport, they are busted for smuggling drugs. They are convicted in a show trial and sentenced to 33 years; in desperation, they contact Yankee Hank, an American lawyer based in Thailand who has been reported to be helpful if you've got the cash. Most scenes were filmed in the Philippines.
 Bright Rainbow After the Rain (2010): The movie is unique in a sense that it is in English and it could be known as the first English movie in Thailand done by Thai students. The movie was filmed in Phayao Province. It is drama about two girls who were best friends- น.ส.สิริพร จันทร์เอี่ยม  (Siripon Janauem) as Ana and น.ส.ณัฐณิชา ขอนพิกุล (Natnicha Khonpikul) as Sara. Ana was rich and Sara was poor with no father when she was growing up. Sara's mother sells vegetables at the market for a living. Sara helped her mother by having a part-time job. Sara's best friend Ana wants to study overseas and searches the internet to find overseas scholarship available for Thais. Sara also wanted to study overseas but didn't have the confidence to apply. Finally, Ana finds a scholarship abroad in Canada, but seeing her very poor best friend struggling in poverty has brought pain in her heart and has become her turning point. She cannot stand to see her best friend having so many difficulties in life while she is enjoying life's comfort. So Ana decided to help Sara escape poverty, but wants to do it secretly. She pretends to be Sara and applys for a scholarship in Sara's name. Ana does this without Sara's knowledge. She steals Sara's personal information and passport to complete Sara's scholarship application. Ana wants to study abroad but had sacrifices her dream for the sake of her best friend. At the end, Sara gets a scholarship in Canada through Ana's secret help. The "Bright Rainbow After the Rain" is the first English movie in Thailand with Thai students as the cast. The director Alejandro Cardeinte is an English teacher teaching at Phayao Pittayakhom School (โรงเรียนพะเยาพิทยาคม). The goal of the movie is to help Thai students learn English. The movie has English subtitles but no Thai subtitles. The movie uses simple day-to-day English. The film's soundtrack was written by the movie director himself. But partly, some music he used is not cleared with copyright yet. The movie is for educational purposes only and not for business.
 Thirteen Lives'' (TBA): Ron Howard's upcoming film based on the Tham Luang cave rescue will shoot in Australia. Gold Coast, Queensland will stand in for Thailand.

See also

 Cinema of Thailand
 List of Thai films

References

External links
 A list of (all) the best movies set in Thailand!
 An interactive map showing filming locations of well-known Hollywood films made in Thailand, together with a list of Thailand focused documentaries.
 Titles with locations including Thailand at the Internet Movie Database
"Hollywood movies made in Thailand"
 Films Shot In Thailand at the Internet Movie Database

Shot in Thailand
 
Films
Thailand